The Well is a 1997 Australian film directed by Samantha Lang and starring Pamela Rabe, Miranda Otto, Paul Chubb, and Frank Wilson. It is based on the 1986 novel of the same name by Elizabeth Jolley.

Synopsis
A young girl named Katherine and her older friend Hester live on an isolated farm run by Hester and her father Francis. Katherine works as a maid and wants to leave because there's too much work. Hester, however, becomes attracted to Katherine and holds her there, promising to give her less work in the future. When Francis dies, Hester decides to sell the farm for cash. They move to small cottage on the edge of the farm and plan to go to Europe. But a tragic accident and the theft of their money change their plans.

Cast
Pamela Rabe as Hester
Miranda Otto as Katherine
Paul Chubb as Harry Bird
Frank Wilson as Francis Harper
Steve Jacobs as Rod Bordern
Geneviève Lemon as Jen Bordern
Simon Lyndon as Abel
Kati Edwards as Molly
Luke Harrison as Bordern Child
Daniel Harrison as Bordern Child
Jennifer Kent as Marg Trinder
Stephen Rae as Murray Trinder
Cameron Shanahan as Bordern Child
Miles Shanahan as Bordern Child
Paul Caesar as Jock
Annalise Lise as Lover
Jamie McLeod as Hitchhiker

Production
Sandra Levy bought the rights to the novel and hired Laura Jones to adapt. They worked on the project for around six years, and then Samantha Lang became involved as director.

Awards
 In 1997 it won three AFI Awards presented by the Australian Film Institute: Best Achievement in Production Design - Michael Philips, Best Performance by an Actress in a Leading Role - Pamela Rabe and Best Screenplay Adapted from Another Source - Laura Jones.
 In 1997 it was nominated for eight AFI awards: Best Achievement in Cinematography - Mandy Walker, Best Achievement in Costume Design - Anna Borghesi, Best Achievement in Direction - Samantha Lang, Best Achievement in Editing - Dany Cooper, Best Achievement in Sound - Anne Breslin, Gethin Creagh, Bronwyn Murphy, Best Film - Sandra Levy, Best Original Music Score - Stephen Rae, Best Performance by an Actress in a Leading Role - Miranda Otto.
 In 1997 it was nominated for the Golden Palm award at the Cannes Film Festival
 In 1997 Pamela Rabe received best actress at the Stockholm Film Festival.
 In 1998 it won the FCCA award presented by the Film Critics Circle of Australia Awards: Best Screenplay - Adapted - Laura Jones
 In 1998 it was nominated for three FCCA awards:  Best Actor (Female) - Miranda Otto, Best Actor (Female) - Pamela Rabe and Best Cinematography - Mandy Walker

Box office
The Well grossed $393,920 at the box office in Australia.

See also
Cinema of Australia

References

External links

The Well at Oz Movies
The Well at the National Film and Sound Archive

Australian drama films
1997 films
1997 drama films
Films directed by Samantha Lang
Films based on Australian novels
Films based on British novels
1990s English-language films